National Revival is a social democratic opposition political party in the Republic of Artsakh. It was founded on 16 May 2013. Hayk Khanumyan is the party's founder and leader.

Ideology 
The party describes itself as an Armenian nationalist and social democratic party. The party's goals are the separation of the government and business, establishing an eco-friendly economy and promoting rural development. The ultimate goal is creating a United Armenia, by unifying Armenia and Artsakh.

Electoral record 
The party participated in the 2015 Nagorno-Karabakh parliamentary election and won 1 seat out of 33 in the National Assembly. Hayk Khanumyan is the only MP from the party.

See also

 List of political parties in Artsakh

References

External links
 National Revival Party on Facebook

Armenian nationalism
Nationalist parties in Asia
Nationalist parties in Europe
Political parties in the Republic of Artsakh
Political parties established in 2013
Social democratic parties in Asia
Social democratic parties in Europe